The Wayne County Courthouse is located in Jesup, Georgia.  It was built in 1902 with Romanesque style elements including a rounded front doorway.  It is constructed of brick and stone with metal trim.  The interior has a cross plan.  There are hooded clocks on all four sides of its tower.

It was added to the National Register of Historic Places in 1980.

References

External links
 

Courthouses on the National Register of Historic Places in Georgia (U.S. state)
National Register of Historic Places in Wayne County, Georgia
Romanesque Revival architecture in Georgia (U.S. state)
Government buildings completed in 1902
Wayne County, Georgia